John Christopher Lewis (born April 2, 1956) is a former professional tennis player from the United States.

Biography
Born in Santa Monica, California, Lewis studied business at the University of Southern California (USC) in the late 1970s.

Tennis career
Lewis was a three-time All-American for the USC Trojans and partnered with Bruce Manson to win the doubles title at the 1977 NCAA Division I Tennis Championships. 

As a professional player he competed briefly on the Grand Prix tennis circuit. His best result came at the 1979 New South Wales Open, where he and Steve Docherty were runners-up in the doubles event, to Peter McNamara and Paul McNamee.

At the 1980 French Open he was a semi-finalist in the mixed doubles, with Leslie Allen. The pair hadn't dropped a set until they lost their semi-final in three sets to Czechoslovakians Stanislav Birner and Renáta Tomanová. He also competed in the men's doubles draw with USC teammate Glenn Petrovic. His only other Grand Slam appearance came in the mixed doubles at the 1980 Wimbledon Championships, where he exited in the second round without playing a single point. Again partnering Allen, the pair received a bye in the first round, then withdrew from their scheduled second round match against Colin Dowdeswell and Greer Stevens.

Business
Lewis co-found a private equity firm in 1982 with Richard Riordan, who was later Mayor of Los Angeles . Former NFL quarterback Pat Haden joined the firm in 1987 and it has since been named Riordan, Lewis & Haden.

Grand Prix career finals

Doubles: 1 (0–1)

References

External links
 
 

1956 births
Living people
American male tennis players
USC Trojans men's tennis players
Tennis players from Santa Monica, California
American financial businesspeople
Businesspeople from Los Angeles